The Manchurian bush warbler (Horornis canturians), also known as Korean bush warbler, is a bird in the family Cettiidae. The species was first described by Robert Swinhoe in 1860. It is found in northeastern China.

The estimated distribution size is reported to be a large range – approximately 1,610,000 km2. Although the global population has not been measured, the population trend appears to be stable. Because of this, the Manchurian bush warbler is evaluated as a least concern species.

References

Manchurian bush warbler
Birds of Manchuria
Manchurian bush warbler
Taxonomy articles created by Polbot